Tris(4-bromophenyl)ammoniumyl hexachloroantimonate is the organic compound with the formula [(4-BrC6H4)3N]SbCl6. Commonly known as magic blue, it is the hexachloroantimonate salt of an amine radical cation. It is a blue solid that reacts with many solvents but is soluble in acetonitrile. The compound is a popular oxidizing agent in organic and organometallic chemistry, with a reduction potential of 0.67 V versus ferrocene/ferrocenium (acetonitrile solution) or 0.70 V versus ferrocene/ferrocenium (dichloromethane solution).

The structure of the cation consists of a three-bladed propeller structure with a planar amine. It is nearly identical to the parent triphenylamine.

Related compounds
Magic green, tris(2,4-dibromophenyl)ammoniumyl hexachloroantimonate,

References

Amines
Free radicals
Bromoarenes
Antimony(V) compounds
Oxidizing agents
Chlorometallates